John F. Cassidy is a former chief executive officer and vice chairman of Cincinnati Bell Inc. He was installed as CEO in July 2003 and stepped down in February 2013. He had formerly served as president of Cincinnati Bell Wireless and had been the chief operating officer of Cincinnati Bell since 2001.

Compensation
According to Forbes.com, Cassidy's cash compensation in December 2004 consisted of a salary of $669,808 and a bonus of $846,602. He also retains stock options in the company. He has 1,800,580 unexercised options and 1,458,820 unexercisable options.

In 2013, Cincinnati Bell's board of directors awarded Jack Cassidy a $9 million cash bonus for his role in developing the a successful spin-off the company's data center business.

References

External links
 Cincinnati Bell Corporate Information
 Forbes.com Profile, including financial info

Living people
Year of birth missing (living people)
Cincinnati Bell
American chief operating officers